Rob Stanton Bowman (born May 15, 1960) is an American film director and producer. He grew up around film and television production, and developed an interest in the field because of the work of his father, director Chuck Bowman. Bowman is a prolific director for television, and has contributed to series such as Star Trek: The Next Generation, and The X-Files, for which he received four consecutive Emmy nominations as a producer. He was an executive producer and director for the comedy drama Castle.

Bowman has directed four feature films: Airborne, The X-Files, Reign of Fire, and Elektra.

Early life and education
Bowman grew up around film and television production. His father, Chuck Bowman, is a filmmaker who became active in the industry when Rob was an adolescent. Bowman first became fascinated with the process of filmmaking when he saw The Wizard of Oz as a child. Growing up, he watched his father make commercials and documentaries, often acting as an assistant crew member. Bowman said that conversations with his father enabled him to see how the hard work of a filmmaking crew becomes invisible when the film is made. He said, "what remains are the emotions and the drama of the story and the characters. What remains is the magic."

In his late teens, he moved to Utah, where he became a "ski bum", and worked as a bartender. After writing, producing and directing a story for a film production class at the University of Utah, Bowman knew he wanted to be a filmmaker. "It became as clear to me as a Fourth of July fireworks display that was where my passion was," he said. Bowman moved to Los Angeles, and got a job at Stephen Cannell Productions, starting in the mail room. He took film classes, and studied film directors, developing a sense of his own personal style. He became fascinated with how each director used the same tools, but arrived at a unique aesthetic. He said, "I learned early on that to be successful as a director, you had to have your own signature. Otherwise, why hire one person over another?" He worked for Cannell for over two years, observing the production of over 400 hours of television. Around age 20, he wrote a mission statement for himself, committing himself to strive for excellence in filmmaking.

Career

Star Trek: The Next Generation and early work
Bowman started directing for television while doing second unit work for Stephen Cannell Productions in 1982. After leaving Cannell's company in 1987, he sent out videos of his work, looking for a job. Impressed by one of Bowman's Stringray episodes, producer Robert H. Justman hired him to direct for Star Trek: The Next Generation during its first season. Bowman was only 27 years old at the time, and in his first meeting with executive producer Rick Berman, Berman mistook him for the pizza delivery boy. He was originally slated to direct the 10th episode of ''Star Treks first season, but one of the series' directors, Donald Petrie, dropped out early to direct the film Mystic Pizza. This gave Bowman the opportunity to direct the fourth episode of the season, "Where No One Has Gone Before". Bowman investigated the sets two weeks early to begin prepping the episode. Bowman told Starlog magazine, "Walking through those empty sets was very intimidating for me. I kept asking myself how I was going to do justice to these sets, tell the story and still get the performances from the cast." Star Trek creator Gene Roddenberry was so impressed with the dailies for the episode, that he made an appearance on set to praise Bowman in front of the cast and crew. Immediately following directing "Where No One Has Gone Before", Bowman directed an episode of the Fox Broadcasting Company's television series Werewolf. Berman and Justman had planned to hire Bowman for only a single episode, but his agent worked out a two-episode deal, leading to Bowman directing the ninth Star Trek episode, "The Battle".

1988 was a busy year for Bowman. In addition to directing five more episodes of Star Trek: The Next Generation that year, he also directed episodes for Werewolf, Sonny Spoon, The Highwayman, Probe, and 21 Jump Street.

On the strength of his direction for the television series Parker Lewis Can't Lose, he was offered to direct his first feature film, Airborne, a coming-of-age story involving teenage rollerbladers.

The X-Files
After seeing a commercial for The X-Files pilot episode, Bowman called his agent and told him he wanted to direct for the series. He was asked to direct the episode "Gender Bender" for The X-Files by executive producer R. W. Goodwin, who had previously worked with Bowman on the series Mancuso, F.B.I.. X-Files creator and executive producer Chris Carter invited Bowman to return and direct more episodes. Bowman was eventually made a producer on the series.

Castle

The American Broadcasting Company (ABC) hired Bowman to direct the pilot for Castle, a television series about a crime novelist who consults with the New York City Police Department (NYPD). The series was created by Andrew Marlowe, who served as executive producer along with his wife Terri Miller. When Miller stepped down as executive producer, Bowman took on the role.

Style
Bowman's signature visual style involves lighting contrasts within a scene, including framing actors as silhouettes. The X-Files writer and producer Frank Spotnitz said that Bowman works very hard to make every "scene as beautiful and as complementary to the story as possible". He said that Bowman's camera movements were never gratuitous and were deliberately planned to aid viewers in understanding what was happening in a scene. Spotnitz complimented Bowman's attention to lighting for mood, saying "You would think that on a television schedule you don't have time to compose and think thoroughly about all these issues, but Rob really does."

Filmography

DirectorTelevisionMacGyver (1985) - 1 episode
Stingray (1986) - 3 episodes
21 Jump Street (1987) - 1 episode
Werewolf (1987) - 2 episodes
Star Trek: The Next Generation (1987) - 13 episodes
The Highwayman (1988) - 3 episodes
Probe (1988) - 1 episode
Midnight Caller (1988) - 1 episode
Alien Nation (1989) - 1 episode
Hardball (1989) - 2 episodes
Baywatch (1989) (episode "The Reunion") - 1 episode
Booker (1989) - 1 episode
Mancuso, F.B.I. (1989) - 2 episodes
Quantum Leap (1989) - 1 episode
Parker Lewis Can't Lose (1990) - 12 episodes
DEA (1990) - 1 episode
Dark Shadows (1991) - 2 episodes
The Hat Squad (1992) - 2 episodes
The Adventures of Brisco County, Jr. (1993) - 1 episode
The X-Files (1993-2000) - 33 episodes
Traps (1994) - 1 episode
M.A.N.T.I.S. (1994) - 2 episodes
VR.5 (1995) - 1 episode
The Lone Gunmen (2001) (pilot)
Castle (2009–2016) - 28 episodes
The Crossing (2018)
Quantico (2018) - 1 episode
The Rookie (2019) - 1 episodeFilmAirborne (1993)
The X-Files (1998)
Reign of Fire (2002)
Elektra (2005)

Producer
The A-Team (1985-1987) (associate producer) - 34 episodes
Stingray (1985) (associate producer)
Riptide (1985) (associate producer)
The Last Precinct (1986) (associate producer) - 8 episodes
The X Files (1995-2000) (producer) - 89 episodes
The Lone Gunmen (2001) TV Series (co-executive producer) - 1 episode
Day Break (2006-2007) TV Series (executive producer) - 13 episodesCastle (2009-2016) TV Series (executive producer) - 171 episodesThe Crossing (2018) TV Series (executive producer) - 1 episodeThe Rookie (2019-2020) TV Series (executive producer) - 20 episodes

OtherThe Making of 'The X-Files: Fight the Future (1998)

References

External links

1960 births
Film producers from Texas
American television directors
Television producers from Texas
Living people
People from Wichita Falls, Texas
Film directors from Texas
University of Utah alumni